The superbone (sometimes known as the double trombone) is a hybrid tenor trombone in B that has both a slide like a regular trombone and a set of valves like a valve trombone.

History 

Trombones that combine both a slide with a set of valves were built as early as the 1860s by Besson. One of the earliest surviving examples was built by Conn in 1884, and closely resembles the modern superbone that appeared in the 1970s. Conn manufactured them through the early 20th century, and a similar instrument with a shorter four-position slide, the valide, was invented by jazz musician and machinist Brad Gowans in 1946.

The term "Superbone" was first coined in the 1970s as a name for the instrument patented by Larry Ramirez of Holton Musical Instruments in collaboration with jazz trumpeter and bandleader Maynard Ferguson. It has a slide lock, which frees the player to operate the valves or the slide with either hand, and was manufactured by Holton as the model TR-395 "Superbone" between 1974 and 2004.

The Holton became a staple instrument for Ferguson, and Don Ellis in his later career. Ferguson used the superbone on the recording "Superbone Meets the Bad Man" from the Chameleon album. Ashley Alexander, another proponent of the instrument, recorded "Spring Can Really Hang You up the Most" on his Secret Love album, which demonstrates the instrument's flexibility. Alexander referred to the instrument as a "double trombone" and wrote a method for it, published by Leblanc in 1980.

Later developments 

In the early 2010s James Morrison in conjunction with Austrian instrument manufacturer Schagerl created his own version of a superbone, employing a larger  bore and three rotary valves operated by the left hand. This arrangement allows the player to use the valves and slide independently or simultaneously.
Wessex Tubas also manufacture a superbone with the same larger  bore, but with three piston valves similar to the Holton.

Construction 

Superbones, unlike the valide, have a fully functioning trombone slide with the usual seven positions. The Holton and Wessex instruments are assembled from three detachable sections; the slide and bell sections attach to each end of the valve assembly, built with three piston valves arranged in the same manner as on other three-valved brass instruments. The player grips the valve section with the left hand, which supports the weight of the instrument while the right arm is free to operate the slide. The James Morrison Schagerl model has the two sections of a normal tenor trombone (slide and bell), with three rotary valves and their tubing incorporated in the bell section in a similar manner to F attachments.

Later models from Schagerl and Wessex use a larger bore of  found more commonly on modern tenor trombones.

Technique 

The Superbone can be played as a slide trombone, a valve trombone, or in combination. Using the slide and valves in combination requires the slide positions to be adjusted, just as when using the trigger of an F attachment on a tenor or bass trombone. Using the slide with the first and third valves engaged has the same effect as using an F attachment. Conversely, the valves can be used to provide trills and ornaments for passages played with the slide.

See also 

 Firebird, a trumpet with both valves and slide.
 Valide trombone, a similar instrument with a shorter slide of four positions.

References

Bibliography 

 
 

Trombones
Continuous pitch instruments
B-flat instruments